Sir Alan George Moses (born 29 November 1945) is a former Lord Justice of Appeal, a Court of Appeal Judge and the former chairman of Independent Press Standards Organisation (IPSO). He is joint Chair of the United Kingdom's Spoliation Advisory Panel.

Education 
He was educated at Bryanston School and University College, Oxford.

Legal career 
He was called to the Bar by the Middle Temple in 1968. He was a Member of the Attorney-General's Panel of Junior Counsel to the Crown, Common Law from 1981 to 1990 and was Junior Counsel to the Inland Revenue, Common Law from 1985 to 1990.  He took silk in 1990. He served as a High Court Judge (Queen's Bench Division) from 1996 to 2005; Presiding Judge of the South Eastern Circuit 1999-2002 and was appointed as a Lord Justice of Appeal in 2005. In 2003 he was the judge in the high-profile Soham murders case which led to the imprisonment of Ian Huntley. He retired from the Court of Appeal in May 2014.

Chairman of IPSO 
He was appointed as the first Chairman of the Independent Press Standards Organisation in 2014. He served two terms, which ended in December 2018. He was succeeded by Lord Faulks QC

Chair of Spoliation Advisory Panel 
He is joint Chair, together with Sir Donnell Deeny, of the Spoliation Advisory Panel.

References

External links
"The forthright judge who relishes taking on the establishment", TheGuardian.com; accessed 1 August 2017.

20th-century English judges
Living people
21st-century English judges
Lords Justices of Appeal
1945 births
Knights Bachelor
Members of the Privy Council of the United Kingdom
English King's Counsel